Punjdhera is a village and union council of Chakwal is a district of Punjab, Pakistan. It is near Mulhal Mughlan, which is located on Sohawa Chakwal Road which leads to Talagangand, Mianwali and its 26KM far from Chakwal City.

Since 1947 Chakwal was a part of District Jehlum. In 1985 Chakwal became a district with four tehsils. The district is administratively subdivided into four tehsils: Tehsil Chakwal Tehsil, Kallar Kahar Tehsil, Choa Saidan Shah Tehsil, and Talagang Tehsil.  It is located 90 km south-east of the federal capital, Islamabad. Famous political personality of Punjdhera was  'Sub Maj Khan Bahadur who served Pakistan army for 32 years and Ghazi of both wars 1965 & 1971 and CHOUDHARY FARZAND ALI KHAN(Late).He is son of CHOUDHARY NADIR ALI KHAN(Late)'

Facilities
There is a Jamia Mosque in the centre of the village & Punjdhera welfare Committee In recent census population of punjdhera is 1502. A government primary school for boys and girls is also located here.

References

Union councils of Chakwal District
Populated places in Chakwal District